Peter May captained the English cricket team in Australia in 1958–59, playing as England in the 1958-59 Ashes series against the Australians and as the MCC in their other matches on the tour. It was widely regarded as one of the strongest teams to depart English shores, comparable with the great teams of Johnny Douglas in 1911-12 and Percy Chapman in 1928-29. It had no obvious weaknesses, and yet it was beaten – and beaten badly. By the First Test the top batsmen had made runs, the Surrey trio of Loader, Laker and Lock had taken wickets, as had Lancashire's Brian Statham. South Australia, Victoria and an Australian XI had all been beaten – the last by the crushing margin of 345 runs – and all seemed rosy for Peter May's touring team. But in the Brisbane Test they lost by 8 wickets and the rest of the series failed to offer any hope of reversing their fortunes. The reasons for their failure were manifold; the captain was too defensive; injuries affected their best players; others were too young and inexperienced such as Arthur Milton, Raman Subba Row, Ted Dexter, Roy Swetman and John Mortimore, or at the end of their career; Godfrey Evans, Trevor Bailey, Jim Laker, Willie Watson and Frank Tyson. Their morale was further bruised when faced with bowlers of dubious legality and unsympathetic umpires. Peter May was criticised for seeing his fiancée Virginia Gilligan, who was travelling with her uncle the Test Match commentator Arthur Gilligan. The press blamed the poor performance on the team's heavy drinking, bad behaviour and lack of pride – a foretaste the treatment losing teams would receive in the 1980s. It was not a happy tour by any means and it would take 12 years to recover The Ashes. As E.W. Swanton noted

It was a tour which saw all sorts of perverse happenings – from an injury list that never stopped (and culminated in only 12 out of 18 being fit to fly to New Zealand), to the dis-satisfaction with umpiring and bowlers' actions that so undermined morale. From various causes England gave below their best...

The management
The tour manager was Freddie Brown, the rugged ex-Northamptonshire and England captain. He had led the 1950–51 touring side, which had been dismissed as the weakest ever sent to Australia, and his refusal to accept defeat in the face of great odds had won him admiration from the Australian public. He had played his last Test in 1953 when England regained The Ashes after 19 years, when he was the only man in the team to have toured with Douglas Jardine in 1932–33 when England had last beaten Australia. Brown had a more robust and combative style than May and wanted to complain officially about what the English party perceived as the throwing actions of the Australian bowlers, which might have resulted in a Bodyline type crisis. May refused, and Brown's unofficial complaints were rebuffed by Sir Donald Bradman. Fred Trueman thought "he was a snob, bad-mannered, ignorant and a bigot" Brown did not like Trueman either and threatened to send the Yorkshire fast bowler home, but May smoothed things over. The assistant-manager was Desmond Eagar, the captain of Hampshire in 1946–57, who built up the attacking team that would win the County Championship in 1961 and was a noted cricket historian. Like Brown, George Duckworth had toured with Jardine, and was now the scorer, baggage-master and general factotum. The physiotherapist or masseur was Desmond Montague, an experienced professional who would have a lot of work to do on the tour.

The captain
In 1958 life looked good for Peter May of Charterhouse, Cambridge, Surrey and England; his county had been County Champions for seven years running, with May the captain for the last two seasons, and England had never been defeated under his leadership. Vice-captain on the triumphant tour of Australia in 1954-55 he had beaten South Africa 3–2 in 1955, considered by many to have been the most exciting Test series since the war, Australia 2–1 in 1956, the West Indies 3–0 in 1957 and New Zealand 4–0 in 1958. He was widely regarded as the best post-war batsman England produced, tall, strong and disciplined with a near-perfect technique, a straight bat and a complete range of strokes. His standards improved with the responsibilities of captaincy and his Test average as captain was 54.03. His greatest century was against the West Indies in 1957 when England followed on 288 runs behind at Edgbaston, he made 285 not out, the highest score by an England captain until Graham Gooch's 333 in 1990, adding 411 with Colin Cowdrey (154) – still an England record for any wicket – and destroyed the mesmerising hold the spinner Sonny Ramadhin had over English batsmen. In the low scoring Ashes series of 1956 he had made 453 runs (90.60) and was out only once for less than 50, when he made 43. Although himself a highly educated amateur and a gentleman he realised that the old class divisions in English cricket were breaking down and under Len Hutton's leadership the amateur and professional had merged. He enjoyed the complete loyalty of the team and the selectors and was ready to help his players and smooth down feathers. As a captain he was a strict team disciplinarian who expected high standards, he was ruthless when the occasion demanded, but could be inflexible and unimaginative and lacked the charisma of a natural leader. In 1958–59 he played too defensively and surrendered the initiative to readily to Benaud as he concentrated on saving runs instead of trying to get batsmen out. Faced with Meckiff's bowling in the disastrous First Test he declined to make an official complaint as it would appear unsporting and sour grapes. A more ruthless captain may have resolved this problem at the start of the series, even at the loss of Tony Lock, but that would have damaged Anglo-Australian cricketing relations. After the Australian tour May beat New Zealand 1-0, India 5-0 and led England to its first series victory in the West Indies 1-0. He lost 2-1 to the 1961 Ashes series and retired due to ill-health having been captain in a then record 41 Tests, Richie Benaud being the only man to defeat him in a Test series.

The opening batsmen
The English bowling was obviously of great strength, but their batting was not far behind. The slightly built left-handed Peter Richardson looked set for a long career for England; he had a Test average of 46.20 at the start of the series and had made centuries against Australia, South Africa, the West Indies and New Zealand. At Johannesburg in 1956-57 he took 488 minutes to reach three figures, a new record for the slowest Test century. Despite this he was known for his ability to make runs against the tightest fielding and was known to be a good tourist, but despite making consistent runs in the state matches he failed in the series and never made another Test century. He had been the amateur captain of Worcestershire and wanted to become a professional player for Kent under Colin Cowdrey, but his old county refused to release him from his contract and he had to sit out the 1959 First Class cricket season while qualifying, and lost his England place. This situation could not have been comfortable for him and was considered to have affected his form in Australia. His opening partner was Arthur Milton, one of the two England players who was not a great name, but he had a Test average of 140.00 after making a century on debut against New Zealand at Headingley, when England lost only two wickets in the match and won by an innings. Milton was one of the last "double internationals", he played football for Arsenal, Bristol City and England. Raman Subba Row had transferred from Surrey to Northamptonshire in 1955 and made 300 against his old county in 1958, earning him a place on the tour. Unfortunately, just as he was needed he broke his thumb and didn't play in any of the Tests, but later made a 59 and 112 on his Ashes debut in the First Test at Edgbaston in 1961.

The middle order batsmen
The England middle order was full of stroke-makers, but it was on the captain Peter May and vice-captain Colin Cowdrey that the real burden lay. Unlike the others they were a permanent fixture in the team and it was generally felt that if they failed then so did the batting. May was the leading England runmaker in 1954-55, 1956 and 1958–59, making runs where others could not. Cowdrey had made his first and best Test century in 1954-55, 102 in an innings of 191 and could send the ball to the boundary with the most fleeting touch of the bat. Like Cowdrey Tom Graveney entertained the crowds with the "sunshine of his style", but was unfairly seen as a fair weather man who only succeeded when the going was good. He came a poor third to May and Cowdrey in the Test batting averages, but was the most consistent batsmen on the tour. If ever a man was famous for a single innings it was Willie Watson when he batted for 346 minutes to save the England at Lord's in 1953 after Australia had reduced them to 12/3. The left-handed strokemaker failed to gain a regular place in the Test team, but was recalled after he moved to Leicestershire as captain in 1957 and had his best season in 1958. He injured his knee getting out of a deckchair on the Iberia and missed the first two months of the tour, thus reducing the touring team to 15. When he did get to play he was out of practice and out of form. Ted Dexter was flown in from Paris (where his wife worked as a model) in the middle of the tour, having been unlucky to not be picked in the first place If he had been part of the original team he would have acclimatised, but although he did well in the tour matches he failed in the Tests, but made 141 in New Zealand. After an indifferent summer against India he was taken the Caribbean in 1959-60 where "Lord Ted" made his name by thrashing the fast bowlers with his ferocious driving. Trevor Bailey was on his third tour down under, but his painfully slow scoring was blamed for paralysing the England batting. This is unjust as the stonewalling of "Barnacle Bailey" had been previously seen as the backbone of the lower border and was unlikely to change his style when promoted to open the innings.

The fast bowlers

England took four fast bowlers; Frank Tyson, Fred Trueman, Brian Statham and Peter Loader, which Swanton thought was one too many, and the all-rounders Trevor Bailey and Ted Dexter. Tyson had been the decisive force in England's 3–1 victory on the previous tour, but had been dogged by a heel injury since 1955 and had played only intermittently for England ever since. Though still capable of blazing his way through many First Class cricket teams, Tyson struggled on the slow, plumb wickets used in the Tests. The outspoken Yorkshireman Fred Trueman called himself "The Best Bloody English Fast Bowler That Ever Drew Bloody Breath" and with considerable justification. He possessed a text-book side-on action which generated great pace and menacing late swing which was coupled with the fitness and stamina to bowl a thousand overs a season. On this tour he was strangely subdued, he was overbowled at the start of the injury-struck tour and took just 9 wickets (30.66) in the last three Tests, but took 28 wickets (19.54) in his other matches. Brian Statham was the "straight man" of the England fast bowling attack, running up the hill and into the wind while Tyson and Trueman let rip from the other end. He maintained a nagging line and length, but "George" was regarded as an unlucky bowler, so many times did he beat the batsman only to see the ball miss the stumps by the thinnest of margins. He lived by two mottos, the first "bowling in matches keeps me fit for bowling" preferring a quiet cigarette to physical training or net practise. The second was "if they miss, I hit", never more aptly demonstrated than in the match against Victoria when he took 7/47 – six bowled and one l.b.w. He was one of the few England players to have a successful tour with 12 wickets (23.83) despite missing the Fifth Test along with Peter Loader due to a car crash. Loader had been in and out of the England team and had toured Australia in 1954–55 without playing in any of the Tests. A fast-medium swing bowler with a wide range of pace and a nasty bouncer he took the first post war Test hat-trick in his 6/36 against the West Indies at Headingley in 1957. He bowled consistently well and took 26 wickets (19.50) on the tour, but only 7 wickets (27.57) in what was to be his last Test series. Along with Tyson, Laker and Loader Trevor Bailey was on his final tour, but did not improve his reputation. A fast-medium swing bowler whose grudging accuracy mirrored his famously negative batting he could be very dangerous in the right conditions, taking 7/34 in 1953-54 and 7/44 in 1957 against the West Indies, but was mostly used for containment and failed on the tour. Ted Dexter was a late reinforcement and a capable swing bowler, but did not bowl in the Tests.

The spin bowlers

Originally 17 players where chosen for the tour, but this was rapidly reduced to 16 when Johnny Wardle was sacked by Yorkshire. He responded with a series of newspaper articles highly critical of Headingley politics and was de-selected for the tour, though he went to Australia as a journalist. Wardle was a real loss, a slow left arm bowler who could bowl Chinamen and reverse googlies and had been lethal in Australia and New Zealand in 1954–55 and South Africa in 1956-57. Even worse he was not replaced and the MCC travelled with only 16 men and two spinners, Laker and Lock. In 1956 Jim Laker had taken 46 wickets (9.60) against the Australians with his ferocious off-spin, still a record for an Ashes series. For Surrey he took 10/88 and 2/42 against the tourists, but at Old Trafford he took 9/37 and 10/53, a record for all First Class cricket. His Surrey "spin twin" was Tony Lock, a slow left arm bowler with a dangerous faster ball. He took only 15 wickets (22.46) wickets against Australia in 1956, but 34 wickets (7.47) against New Zealand in 1958. The selectors had had doubts about their effectiveness overseas and neither had been taken in 1954–55, but Laker would top the England Test and tour bowling averages. Lock would have a chequered tour; taking only 5 wickets (75.20) in the Tests, but 28 wickets (21.32) in the other First Class games. Ironically his faster ball that became embroiled him in the throwing controversy proved to be ineffective in the Tests. In the 1962–63 tour Lock would not be taken, but joined Western Australia and was instrumental in their defeat of the MCC and their rise in Sheffield Shield cricket. Belatedly the MCC sent John Mortimore to Australia by plane, an off-spinning all-rounder who was later kept out of the England team by the similar, but superior, skills of Ray Illingworth and Fred Titmus.

The wicket-keepers and fielders
The great England wicket-keeper Godfrey Evans was on his fourth tour of Australia, having visited before in 1946–47, 1950–51 and 1954–55. He was chosen in part for his batting, having made centuries against the West Indies and India, but his loud and enthusiastic wicketkeeping was a joy to watch and considered by far the best in the world. When he returned to England in 1959 he missed three stumpings in fifteen minutes against India and retired from Test cricket as he no longer met his own exacting standards, but his Test record number of 173	catches and 46 stumpings remained unbeaten for eighteen years. The Marylebone Cricket Club preferred to rotate their reserve wicket-keepers and in 1958–59 it was the turn of the reserve Surrey keeper Roy Swetman. He was by far the shortest man in the team and looked only 17, but was in fact 25. Although a good man behind the stumps and a decent lower order batsman he was not Evans and lost his England place in 1960. In 1956 England had out-fielded and out-caught Australia and they were still a strong fielding team. Colin Cowdrey would be the first slip fielder to take 100 Test catches, Peter May and Tom Graveney were good slips and Ted Dexter an athletic cover. Fred Trueman was a good close field and Tony Lock was considered the greatest backward short leg in the world and one of the safest pair of hands in cricket. Peter Richardson, Willie Watson and Trevor Bailey were good all round fielders, though the latter two were slowing down at the end of their careers.

Injuries
The MCC team suffered from a long list of injuries that affected their ability to contest the Ashes series, particularly as they only had a 16-man squad because Johnny Wardle was not replaced when he was dropped. When they Australian tour ended only 12 men were fit enough to proceed to the following tour in New Zealand, Bailey, Evans, Laker, Loader, Milton and Statham returning to England instead.
Trevor Bailey had a back ailment at the beginning of the tour that affected his bowling and the Fifth Test was his last Test, as he was considered too unfit to tour New Zealand. He continued to play for Essex and had his best season in 1959.
Godfrey Evans broke his middle finger and missed the Third Test, leading to Roy Swetman's unfortunate debut. When he returned for the Fourth Test it had not full healed and broke it again, but he continued to keep wicket on the second day. He was replaced on the third day by Tom Graveney, a part-time keeper for Gloucestershire, batted in both innings, but missed the Fifth Test.
Jim Laker announced his retirement from First Class cricket at the start of the tour because of his arthritic spinning finger, which was at times immobile and sometimes caused him so much pain that he could not sleep at night. Laker retired from bowling in one match, missed the next due to sunstroke and the Fourth Test because of arthritis, but played in the Fifth Test despite having a sore throat and high temperature.
Peter Loader suffered from sunstroke in an early match and had to retire from the field, and was unfit to play in the next game. He retired from the Australian XI match with a strained Achilles tendon, and spent several days in bed with a high temperature, but still played in the First Test in the following week. He had a groin strain which kept him out of the New South Wales game and the Fourth Test. He and Statham were in a car crash before the Fifth Test and he never played for England again.
Tony Lock had a long-term knee injury which could prevent him from bowling long spells, though he often had to do so because of the absence of other fit players.
Peter May pulled a knee ligament in the first match of the tour, but returned to make a century using a runner and was fit for all the Tests after missing two games.
Arthur Milton was hit repeatedly in the South Australia tour match on Christmas Eve had his finger fractured, which was jarred and broken again in the game against Victoria and he was sent home before the Fifth Test.
Brian Statham was with Peter Loader when they had a car accident just before the Fifth Test, but he recovered to overtake Alec Bedser's 236 wickets to become the greatest wicket-taker in Test cricket.
Raman Subba Row A ball hit by Ron Archer broke Raman Subba Row's wrist when fielding against Queensland, another injury removed him from contention after he had made three fifties in three games when Richardson and Milton were out of form and needed to be replaced.
Fred Trueman contracted a mysterious back ailment in Queensland, as he would on the 1962–63 tour, which made him unavailable for the First Test at Brisbane in conditions tailor-made for his fast swing bowling. After ordinary medicines had no effect he was cured by drinking large amounts of fresh lemon juice and was fit for the Second Test, but was not picked until the Third Test. He played in a New South Wales game despite having a cold.
Frank Tyson had a long-term injury in the form of a blistered right heel as a result of his foot twisting inside ill-fitting cricket boots, he also missed tour games due to lumbago.
Willie Watson injured his knee getting out of a deckchair on board the Iberia, en route to Australia.  He was flown ahead to Perth where he had some gristle surgically removed from his knee, but instead of being sent home or a replacement sent for he remained with the party.  After playing in two Tests he strained his groin bowling in the nets before the Fifth Test, but recovered to play in New Zealand.

The England touring squad
Below are the Test statistics of the England squad. As was the convention of the time gentleman amateurs have their initials in front of their surname and professional players have their initials after their name, if their initials were used at all.

First Test - Brisbane

See Main Article - 1958-59 Ashes series

Second Test - Melbourne

See Main Article - 1958-59 Ashes series

Third Test - Sydney

See Main Article - 1958-59 Ashes series

Fourth Test - Adelaide

See Main Article - 1958-59 Ashes series

Fifth Test - Melbourne

See Main Article - 1958-59 Ashes series

Ceylon
The English team had a stopover in Colombo en route to Australia and played a one-day single-innings match there against the Ceylon national team, which at that time did not have Test status.

Annual reviews
 Playfair Cricket Annual 1959
 Wisden Cricketers' Almanack 1960

References

 
 
 Ashley Brown, The Pictorial History of Cricket, Bison Books, 1988
 Cris Freddi, The Guinness Book of Cricket Blunders, Guinness Publishing, 1996
 Tom Graveney with Norman Giller, The Ten Greatest Test Teams, Sidgewick & Jackson, 1988
 Ken Kelly and David Lemmon, Cricket Reflections : Five Decades of Cricket Photographs, Heinemann, 1985
 Keith Miller, Cricket From the Grandstand, Oldbourne, 1959
 E.W. Swanton, Swanton in Australia, with MCC 1946–1975, Fontana, 1977
 Fred Trueman, As It Was, The Memoirs of Fred Trueman, Pan Books, 2004

Further reading
 
 
 Richie Benaud, A tale of two Tests: With some thoughts on captaincy, Hodder & Stoughton, 1962
 Mark Browning, Richie Benaud: Cricketer, Captain, Guru, Kangaroo Press, 1996
 Robert Coleman, Seasons in the Sun: the Story Of the Victorian Cricket Association, Hargreen Publishing, 1993.
 Bill Frindall, The Wisden Book of Test Cricket 1877–1978, Wisden, 1979
 David Frith, Pageant of Cricket, The Macmillan Company of Australia, 1987
 David Frith, England Versus Australia: An Illustrated History of Every Test Match Since 1877, Viking, 2007
 Chris Harte, A History of Australian Cricket, Andre Deutsch, 1993
 Alban George Moyes, Benaud & Co: The story of the Tests, 1958–1959, Angus & Robertson, 1959
 Ray Robinson, On Top Down Under, Cassell, 1975
 E.W. Swanton (ed), The Barclays World of Cricket, Collins, 1986
 
 Bernard Whimpress, Chuckers: A history of throwing in Australian cricket, Elvis Press, 2004.
 Bob Willis and Patrick Murphy, Starting with Grace, Stanley Paul, 1986

1958 in Australian cricket
1958 in English cricket
1959 in Australian cricket
1958 in Ceylon
1959 in English cricket
Australian cricket seasons from 1945–46 to 1969–70
1958-59
1958
International cricket competitions from 1945–46 to 1960
Sri Lankan cricket seasons from 1880–81 to 1971–72
1958-59